Tomasz Mirosław Dudziński (born 1 February 1973), is a Polish politician.

Dudziński was born in Parczew. He was elected to the Sejm on 25 September 2005, getting 14,892 votes in Chełm as a candidate from the Law and Justice list.  He joined Poland Comes First when that party split from Law and Justice in 2010.

See also
Members of Polish Sejm 2005–2007

External links
Tomasz Mirosław Dudziński - parliamentary page - includes declarations of interest, voting record, and transcripts of speeches.

1973 births
Living people
People from Parczew County
Poland Comes First politicians
Law and Justice politicians
Members of the Polish Sejm 2005–2007
Tomasz
Members of the Polish Sejm 2007–2011